Johann Stadlmayr (or Stadelmayer) (born perhaps around 1580  probably in Freising; died 12 July 1648 in Innsbruck) was a composer and long serving Hofkapellmeister  to the Princes of Tirol.

Stadlmayr joined the Hofkapelle in Salzburg in 1603, rapidly rising to the post of Hofkapellmeister there and being appointed in 1607 Hofkapellmeister at the court of Innsbruck by Maximilian III, Archduke of Austria and later employed by his successor Leopold V. He wrote primarily church music, with 21 publications of masses, motets and music for Vespers issued in Augsburg, Munich, Passau, Vienna, Ravensburg, Antwerp and Innsbruck. His contemporary Michael Praetorius called him a „trefflichen Contrapunctisten und Musicus“.

References

External links 

 
 Scores at Musikland-Tirol (uses Sibelius Plug-In Scorch)

German Baroque composers
1648 deaths
Year of birth uncertain
Austrian Baroque composers